The 1945 Northwestern Wildcats team was an American football team that represented Northwestern University in the Big Ten Conference during the 1945 Big Ten Conference football season. In their 11th year under head coach Pappy Waldorf, the Wildcats compiled a 4–4–1 record (3–3–1 against Big Ten opponents), finished in fourth place in the Big Ten, and were outscored by a total of 148 to 127. 

Four Northwestern players received honors from the Associated Press (AP) or United Press (UP) on the 1945 All-Big Ten Conference football team: Max Morris at end (AP-1, UP-1); Jim Lecture at guard (AP-1 UP-1); Dick Conners at halfback ((UP-2); and Paul Schuetz at Northwestern (UP-2). Morris was also selected as a consensus first-team All-American. Conners ranked 14th in the nation with 671 rushing yards.

Schedule

References

Northwestern
Northwestern Wildcats football seasons
Northwestern Wildcats football